There have been many police chiefs of the Atlanta Police Department in the history of Atlanta, Georgia United States.
The city shifted from a rural, Marshal/Deputy Marshal model in 1873.

The current interim police chief is Darin Schierbaum. 

The city is in the process of conducting a nationwide search for a permanent chief. Schierbaum succeeded former police chief Rodney N. Bryant. Bryant took the helm after former chief Erika Shields resigned following the killing of Rayshard Brooks. Bryant served as interim police chief until the city named him as chief in June of 2020. Chief Schierbaum joined the Atlanta Police Department in 2002.

See also
Georgia State Patrol

References

Atlanta
 
Police Chiefs

https://www.atlantapd.org/about-apd/office-of-the-chief/assistant-chief-of-police-darin-schierbaum